Dreamin' Man Live '92 is a live album by the Canadian / American musician Neil Young, released on December 8, 2009. It features live, solo acoustic performances of all ten songs from Harvest Moon, recorded on tour in 1992. The album is volume twelve in Young's Archives Performance Series and the fifth to be released. It was originally slated for release on November 2, 2009, but was delayed for over a month; a vinyl release followed on March 30, 2010.

Track listing
All songs written by Neil Young.

 "Dreamin' Man" – 5:03 (Portland, Oregon; January 24, 1992)
 "Such a Woman" – 4:59 (Detroit, Michigan; May 20, 1992)
 "One of These Days" – 4:59 (Los Angeles, California; September 21, 1992)
 "Harvest Moon" – 5:26 (Los Angeles, California; September 21, 1992)
 "You and Me" – 4:01 (Los Angeles, California; September 21, 1992)
 "From Hank to Hendrix" – 4:47 (Los Angeles, California; September 21, 1992)
 "Unknown Legend" - 5:31 (Los Angeles, California; September 22, 1992)
 "Old King" – 3:10 (Los Angeles, California; September 22, 1992)
 "Natural Beauty" – 11:26 (Chicago, Illinois; November 19, 1992)
 "War of Man" – 6:27 (Minneapolis, Minnesota, November 22, 1992)

Personnel
Neil Young – vocals, guitar, harmonica, piano, banjo

References

Neil Young live albums
2009 live albums
Reprise Records live albums
Albums produced by Neil Young
Albums produced by John Hanlon